Göran Högberg (20 December 1948 – 21 January 2019) was a Swedish long-distance runner. He competed in the marathon at the 1980 Summer Olympics.

References

External links
 

1948 births
2019 deaths
Athletes (track and field) at the 1980 Summer Olympics
Swedish male long-distance runners
Swedish male marathon runners
Olympic athletes of Sweden
People from Sollefteå Municipality
Sportspeople from Västernorrland County
20th-century Swedish people